Marvin Çuni (born 10 July 2001) is a professional footballer who plays as a forward for 3. Liga club 1. FC Saarbrücken, on loan from Bayern Munich II. Born in Germany, he has represented Albania at youth level.

Club career
After playing youth football for Eintracht Freising, Çuni joined Bayern Munich in 2012 and progressed through all the youth teams. In summer 2020, he joined Regionalliga Südwest club Sonnenhof Großaspach on a season-long loan. He made 34 appearances for the club, scoring 19 goals.

On 1 September 2021, Çuni extended his contract by two years until June 2024, and moved to 2. Bundesliga club SC Paderborn on loan until the end of the season.

On 24 June 2022, Çuni joined 3. Liga club 1. FC Saarbrücken on loan for the rest of the season.

International career
Çuni scored once in three appearances for the Albania under-19 team in the 2020 UEFA European Under-19 Championship qualification.

Career statistics

Notes

References

External links

2001 births
Living people
German footballers
Albanian footballers
Albania youth international footballers
Association football forwards
FC Bayern Munich footballers
SG Sonnenhof Großaspach players
SC Paderborn 07 players
1. FC Saarbrücken players
2. Bundesliga players
Regionalliga players